Tahir Hussain may refer to:
 Tahir Hussain (19 September 1938 – 2 February 2010), Indian film producer, director 
 Tahir Hussain (physicist) (1923– 21 December 2010), Pakistani nuclear physicist
 Tahir Hussain Siddique, Indian politician and leader of Samajwadi Party and an ex-member of Uttar Pradesh Legislative Assembly
 Tahir Hussain Mashhadi (b. 1942), a Lt Colonel in the Pakistan Army, and later a member of the Senate of Pakistan